A bullshit job or pseudowork is meaningless or unnecessary wage labour which the worker is obliged to pretend to have a purpose. Polling in the United Kingdom and the Netherlands indicates that around 40% of workers consider their job to fit this description.

The concept was coined by anthropologist David Graeber in a 2013 essay in Strike Magazine, On the Phenomenon of Bullshit Jobs,  and elaborated upon in his 2018 book Bullshit Jobs.

Graeber also formulated the concept of bullshitization, where previously meaningful work turns into a bullshit job through corporatization, marketization or managerialism. This has been applied to academia, which Graeber and others contend has been bullshitized by the expansion of managerial roles and administrative work caused by neoliberal educational reforms, contributing to the erosion of academic freedom.


See also 

 Boondoggle
 Busywork
 Critique of work
 Dilbert principle
 Emotional labour
 Front organization
 Interpassivity
 Make-work job
 On Bullshit
 Parkinson's law
 Presenteeism
 Quaternary sector of the economy
 Refusal of work
 Sinecure
 Underemployment
 Vacuum activity
 Workhouse

References

Further reading 
 Your Call Is Important to Us: The Truth About Bullshit by Laura Penny

External links 
 On the Phenomenon of Bullshit Jobs, Strike Magazine (August 2013) 

Labor
Work
American slang